Roman Grill (born March 1, 1966) is a German former footballer who is now a player agent. A defender, Grill spent eleven years playing for Bayern Munich's reserve team, and made one first-team appearance, replacing Thomas Helmer in a UEFA Cup match against Benfica in December 1995. Bayern went on to win the competition that season. After retiring, Grill worked as a coach with Bayern's youth team, before starting his own player agency in 2006. His clients include Owen Hargreaves, Philipp Lahm and Piotr Trochowski.

References

External links
acta7 - Grill's agency

1966 births
Living people
German footballers
FC Bayern Munich II players
FC Bayern Munich footballers
UEFA Cup winning players
FC Bayern Munich non-playing staff
Association football agents
German sports agents
Association football defenders